Bomarea glaucescens is a species of flowering plant in the family Alstroemeriaceae. It is native to Peru, Bolivia and Ecuador. It grows in wet páramo habitat among Polylepis and next to lakes, as well as grassy páramo and Andean forests. It is not a threatened species but some populations are vulnerable to habitat destruction as the páramo is converted to pasture and pine and eucalyptus plantations.

References

glaucescens
Flora of Ecuador
Flora of Bolivia
Flora of Peru
Near threatened plants
Plants described in 1816
Páramo flora
Taxonomy articles created by Polbot
Taxa named by John Gilbert Baker
Taxa named by Carl Sigismund Kunth